This is a list of the municipalities in the state of Paraíba (PB), located in the Northeast Region of Brazil. Paraíba is divided into 223 municipalities, which are grouped into 23 microregions, which are grouped into 4 mesoregions.

See also
Geography of Brazil
List of cities in Brazil

Paraiba